Ghodasgaon may refer to

 Ghodasgaon, Dhule District, Maharashtra, India
 Ghodasgaon, Jalgaon District, Maharashtra, India